Ferocactus santa-maria is a species of Ferocactus from Mexico.

References

External links
 
 

santa-maria
Flora of Mexico
Plants described in 1913